John Fraser Kerr (January 6, 1904 – June 2, 1989) was a Canadian politician. He served in the Legislative Assembly of New Brunswick from 1961 to 1970 as member of the Liberal party.

References

1904 births
1989 deaths